E is a text editor originally developed at the Stanford AI Lab in the 1970s for the WAITS operating system.

E was one of the first WYSIWYG editors. Richard Stallman visited the Stanford Artificial Intelligence Lab in 1976 and was quite impressed by this technology. Carl Mikkelsen had previously implemented a similar hack to the TECO text editor, adding a combined display+editing mode called "Control-R".

References

External links 
 « Essential E by Arthur Samuel », Stanford Artificial Intelligence Laboratory, March 1980.

Text editors
History of software